Jeffers Garden is an unincorporated community in Clatsop County, Oregon, United States. Its population, recorded as the Jeffers Gardens census-designated place, was 368 as of the 2010 census.

References

Census-designated places in Clatsop County, Oregon
Unincorporated communities in Clatsop County, Oregon
Census-designated places in Oregon
Unincorporated communities in Oregon
Populated coastal places in Oregon